Jasprit Jasbirsingh Bumrah (born 6 December 1993) is an Indian international cricketer who plays for the Indian national cricket team in all formats of the game. A right-arm fast bowler with a unique bowling action, Bumrah is considered one of the best fast bowlers in the world. He plays for Gujarat cricket team and Mumbai Indians in first-class cricket and Indian Premier League respectively.  

He made his international debut in January 2016 and quickly established himself as a key player in the Indian team. He has been consistently ranked among the top bowlers in the ICC Player Rankings for ODI and T20I bowlers. He is known for his ability to take wickets in the death overs, and has been instrumental in India's success in limited-overs cricket in recent years. He has several records to his name including the fastest Indian bowler to 50 and 100 wickets in ODIs and the fastest Indian to reach 50 wickets in T20Is. He is one of the most successful fast bowlers India has ever produced. He currently plays IPL only for Mumbai Indians

Personal life 
Bumrah was born in a Sikh Punjabi family which settled in Ahmedabad, Gujarat. Bumrah's father, Jasbir Singh, died when he was 5 years old. He was brought up by his mother Daljit Bumrah, a school teacher in Ahmedabad, Gujarat in a middle-class surrounding. Daljit made an appearance in the 2019 Netflix documentary Cricket Fever: Mumbai Indians where she was emotional on the cricketing success of her son.

On 15 March 2021, he married model and presenter Sanjana Ganesan in Goa. Hailing from Pune, Maharashtra, Ganesan is a former Miss India finalist and was also a participant in MTV's Splitsvilla in 2014.

Domestic cricket
Bumrah played first-class cricket for Gujarat and made his debut against Vidarbha in October 2013 during the 2013–14 season.

A right-arm fast-medium pacer from Gujarat with an unusual bowling action, Bumrah made his T20 debut against Maharashtra in the 2012–13 Syed Mushtaq Ali Trophy, and also helped his side clinch the title with his Man of the Match performance. His figures of 3/14 were instrumental to Gujarat's win over Punjab in the final.

A 19-year old Bumrah grabbed instant limelight when on his Indian Premier League (IPL) debut, he finished with figures of 3/32 against Royal Challengers Bangalore. Though Bumrah played 2 matches in the Pepsi IPL 2013 for Mumbai Indians, the Mumbai Indians retained him for Pepsi IPL 2014 season.

On 11 December 2020, he scored his maiden first class half century (55*) against Australia A during the India tour of Australia.

International career 

In the two matches, T20I series against West Indies in August 2016, he became the bowler to claim most wickets (28) in Twenty20 Internationals in one calendar year surpassing the record of Dirk Nannes.

In January 2017, in the second match of T20I series of England's 2016–17 India tour, Bumrah picked up two wickets and gave away 20 runs and was awarded the Player of the Match. During the 2017 Sri Lanka tour, Bumrah recorded the most wickets (15) taken by any fast bowler in a bilateral ODI series of five or fewer matches. He is remembered for bowling a no-ball in the final of the Champions Trophy 2017 that resulted in a wicket. The batsman, Fakhar Zaman, went on to score a match-defining century.

In November 2017, he was named in India's Test squad for their series against South Africa. He made his Test debut for India against South Africa at Newlands in Cape Town on 5 January 2018 In the 3rd Test Match of India Tour of South Africa 2017-18, at Johannesburg, Bumrah took his maiden five-wicket haul in Tests, with the figures of 5/54 from 18.5 overs.

On the Boxing Day Test of India Tour of Australia 2018, with career-best figures of 6/33, Bumrah became the first Asian bowler to take five-wicket hauls in Australia, England and South Africa in the same calendar year. Overall, he had finished the series as the joint highest wicket-taker, with 21 wickets, the other bowler being Australian bowler, Nathan Lyon. He had finished the year, with 48 wickets, which was a record for Indian bowler in his debut year in Test cricket. For his performances in 2018, he was named both in the World Test XI and ODI XI by the ICC. In April 2019, he was named in India's squad for the 2019 Cricket World Cup. The International Cricket Council (ICC) named him as one of the five exciting talents making their Cricket World Cup debut. On 5 June 2019, in India's opening match of the tournament, against South Africa, Bumrah played in his 50th ODI match. On 6 July 2019, in the match against Sri Lanka, Bumrah took his 100th wicket in ODIs and became the second-fastest Indian to do so after his teammate, Mohammed Shami, who is currently the fastest Indian to 100 ODI wickets. He finished the tournament as the leading wicket-taker for India and the fifth highest overall, with eighteen dismissals in nine matches. He was named in the 'Team of the Tournament' by the ICC and ESPNCricinfo.

In August 2019, Bumrah took his fourth Test five-wicket haul against West Indies in the first Test match of India tour of West Indies 2019, at the Sir Vivian Richards Stadium, with figures of 5/7 in the 2nd innings. In the second Test match, he became the third Indian to take a hat-trick in a Test match.

Bumrah played his maiden Test match in India in the M. A. Chidambaram Stadium against England in February 2021 after playing 17 Tests overseas. His maiden Test wicket in India was of Daniel Lawrence for nought in England Tour of India 2021.

Bumrah was named in India's squad for the 2021 ICC Men's T20 World Cup. He was one of the only three fast bowlers in the main squad, the other two being Mohammed Shami and the white-ball specialist, Bhuvneshwar Kumar.

In January 2022, during the second innings of the second test of 2021 India-South Africa test series, Bumrah became the Indian bowler with the worst economy rate while defending a target with minimum 100 balls bowled, which was his first test as team India's vice-captain.

In February 2022, Bumrah was named Vice-captain of India for the T20I and Test series against Sri Lanka owing to the unavailability of regular vice-captain KL Rahul. In March 2022, Bumrah took his maiden Test five-wicket haul in India during the second day night Test against Sri Lanka.

In April 2022, Bumrah was among the Wisden Five Cricketers of the Year for that year.

On 1 July 2022, Bumrah captained the Indian Test team against England for the first time instead of Rohit Sharma, who is ruled out due to suffering from COVID-19.

On 2 July 2022, Jasprit Bumrah hit 35 runs in an over bowled by Stuart Broad in Test cricket, beating the 18-year older record set by Brian Lara (who had scored 28 runs in an over).

On 12 July 2022, he took 6/19 in a One Day International match against England, India's best figures against England, and the third best figures for India in ODIs.

On 17 July 2022, Bumrah became the number 1 ranked bowler in ODIs according to ICC.

In August 2022, Bumrah was diagnosed with a stress reaction in his back and was ruled out of India's Asia Cup campaign later that month. However, in September, Bumrah was declared fit and was picked in India's T20 World Cup squad. The same squad also featured in India's build-up to the tournament with home games against Australia and South Africa. Bumrah featured in two of the three T20s against Australia, but was pulled out on the eve of the South Africa series, India's last before the World Cup, after he complained of back pain.

Bowling style
Bumrah gained prominence with his unorthodox action, and hyperextended elbows. His run-up is short, the first part of which consists of small, stuttering strides. He has an anomalous, stiff-armed action yet generates high pace, and his unusual point of release makes it difficult for the batsmen to read his bowling. Indian team often use him in death overs.  He bowls outside the off-stump, Yorkers and short length balls frequently.

Bumrah's slinging, unorthodox, front on bowling action, puts lots of load on his back. This is possibly the cause for his back problems, which hinder him from representing India without un-interruption in recent times. Experts were often wary of an injury risk due to his unorthodox bowling action. He has a very short run-up, which puts lot pressure on his back when he lands, which puts him into the situation of high risk of injuries.

As per former international bowler Shoaib Akhtar, Bumrah's bowling action can cause him back injuries, his bowling action is front on, and the bowlers with this type of action generate speed from their shoulders and back, which increases the chances of injury.

Bumrah carved himself a reputation for possessing an uncanny ability to hit the block hole, just like his former Mumbai Indians teammate, Sri Lankan Lasith Malinga. Bumrah has grown into an asset for the Indian team in the limited-overs format.

Bumrah is considered one of the fastest Indian bowlers with an average speed of 142 km/h, his fastest being 153 km/h, which he bowled during the first Test match of India Tour of Australia 2018, at the Adelaide Oval, outpacing Mitchell Starc and Pat Cummins.

"My all-time favourite bowlers are Mitchell Johnson, Wasim Akram and Brett Lee. I used to watch their videos and learn from them. I have learnt a lot from Johnson, and Malinga too. I try to learn from any senior bowlers who have played international cricket." – Bumrah

Mumbai Indians bowling coach and former New Zealand fast bowler Shane Bond said: "Boom's action, though unique, is repeatable. He has great control."

Former Indian fast bowler Ashish Nehra also commented on his bowling action:

"What you do in 75–80% of your run-up, nothing matters. It's the last 15–20%, the last four-five steps, which is the main thing. That is bowling. Bumrah runs differently, but in his last three-four steps – he is loading, front leg, back leg, everything is in alignment, and he is quick through the air."

Statistics
He is the first Asian bowler to take 5 wickets in a test innings in South Africa, England and Australia during the same calendar year. He also holds the record for most runs scored in a single over in a Test match, when he scored 35 runs off the bowling of Stuart Broad at Edgbaston in July 2022.

Notes

References

External links 

Jasprit Bumrah's profile page on Wisden

1993 births
Living people
Indian cricketers
India Test cricketers
India One Day International cricketers
India Twenty20 International cricketers
Gujarat cricketers
Mumbai Indians cricketers
Cricketers from Ahmedabad
India Green cricketers
Cricketers at the 2019 Cricket World Cup
Wisden Cricketers of the Year